Roopa Dhatt is an Indian American physician, an Assistant Professor and Internal Medicine Hospitalist at Georgetown University Medical Center, and at a community hospital, Washington, DC. In 2015 she co-founded Women in Global Health, which aims to reduce gender disparity among global health leaders, and subsequently became the organisation's Executive Director. 

During the COVID-19 pandemic, she highlighted the gender aspects of COVID-19, including that a disproportionate number of frontline workers are women, yet not part of leadership roles. She was part of a team that evaluated the language used by men and women leaders during the pandemic. On International Women's Day 2021, along with World Health Organization (WHO) Director-General Tedros Adhanom, she signed a memorandum of understanding on the position of women in global health.

Early life and education

Roopa Dhatt was born in the 1980s in India, and emigrated to the United States at the age of five. She later recalled her exposure to health inequities during a visit to India in the early 1990s when she was nine years old, leading her to pursue a career in medicine.

She earned a bachelor's degree in cell biology and African-American and African studies from the University of California, Davis, and a master's degree in public affairs from the Paris Institute of Political Studies. She received her M.D. from Temple University School of Medicine in Philadelphia. In 2012, as a medical student, she became president of the International Federation of Medical Students' Associations.

Career
Prior to becoming a physician in Internal medicine at  Georgetown University Medical Centerin Washington, DC, Dhatt trained in internal medicine and international health at the Case Western Reserve University School of Medicine in Cleveland.

Women in Global Health
In 2015 she co-founded an organisation which aims to reduce gender disparity among global health leaders, the Women in Global Health, of which she is the Executive Director. She is one of the Women Leaders in the Global Health Conferences.

COVID-19 pandemic
In September 2020, representing Women in Global Health at a Women in Global Health Security Summit, Dhatt highlighted that a disproportionate number of frontline workers are women, many providing informal unpaid care. This disparity she says, contributes "to international female healthcare workers' widespread underpayment, under-recognition, and unequal exposure to contagion." She then presented Women in Global Health's five requests pertaining to women:

 To be included in decision-making
 Safe and decent working conditions
 To be recognised for their work
 "Gender-sensitive" data analysis process and response
 Funds to be directed to important gender problems

In the same year, she was part of a team that evaluated the language used by men and women leaders during the COVID-19 pandemic. The findings were published in BMJ Global Health in a paper titled "Political and gender analysis of speeches made by heads of government during the COVID-19 pandemic."

On 8 March 2021, Dhatt signed a memorandum of understanding with WHO Director-General, Tedros Adhanom with the aim "to further the shared goals and objectives of women's economic empowerment, gender transformative change in Universal Health Coverage and the health workforce on a global level".

On 1 July 2021, Dhatt attended the Generation Equality Forum in Paris, meeting with global leaders, including Melinda Gates, President Macron and Secretary Hillary Clinton. With partners the Government of France and the World Health Organization (WHO), Women in Global Health launched commitments for the Gender Equal Health and Care Workforce Initiative.

Selected publications

References

External links

1980s births
Living people
21st-century American physicians
American women of Indian descent in health professions
American women writers of Indian descent
Case Western Reserve University alumni
Georgetown University Medical Center faculty
Indian emigrants to the United States
Nationality missing
Punjabi American
Sciences Po alumni
Temple University School of Medicine alumni
University of California, Davis alumni
Year of birth missing (living people)
American women academics
21st-century American women